Nestlé Nido Young Stars is a television show hosted by Atiqa Odho, who brought in with her a wealth of experience in media and her practical, candid and friendly approach. The show was directed by Kamran Qureshi and Iram Qureshi. It was Eveready picture's production.

Nestlé Nido Young Stars Show (Nido Ye Taare Hamare), a platform wherein children's achievements and their parents' efforts are celebrated and propagated to a wider audience. The show aims to focus child nutrition, education, good parenting, motherly wisdom, grooming kids and result oriented tips for nurturing.

The concept
It is an educational talk show based program focusing on how to raise high performing children. There is a nutritionist and an educationist in the show to talk about the topics of the day and to give tips to the audience about their children. Mothers was engaged in involved parenting by gaining access to a wide range of nutritional and educational topics, with experts advice and the much-needed dose of motherly wisdom that epitomizes motherhood.

The show
Each show focuses a family, which is considered to be a star family, child for his/her achievements, and the parents for bringing up their child in such manner. A package containing the pictures, certificates of achievements, daily routine, parents, teachers & friends talking about the kid, etc.
A question & answer session is carried live on the set and also the emails are taken. A celebrity is there every week in the show as role model.

Soundtrack

The theme song 'Meri Pyari Ammi Jaan' (English: My dear Mum) was sung by Shabnam Majeed composed by Arshad Mehmood and lyricists was Anwar Maqsood.

Nutritionist
Qualified nutritionists Dr. Riffat Ayesha and Sarah Asad were on board in the show to guide parents in raising performing children.

Celebrities

 Imran Abbas
 Zaheer Abbas
 Javeria Abbasi
 Shamoon Abbasi
 Vaneeza Ahmad
 Shahood Alvi
 Bushra Ansari
 Rubina Ashraf
 Aijaz Aslam
 Zeba Bakhtiar
 Naeem Bokhari
 Sabahat Ali Bukhari
 Shagufta Ejaz
 Uzma Gillani
 Ali Haider
 Talat Hussain
 Madiha Iftikhar
 Noman Ijaz
 Javed Jabbar
 Shabbir Jan
 Abdullah Kadwani
 Sahira Kazmi
 Ahsan Khan
 Ayesha Khan
 Jahangir Khan
 Marina Khan
 Rahat Fateh Ali Khan
 Shaista Lodhi
 Arshad Mahmood
 Angeline Malik
 Asad Malik
 Anwar Maqsood
 Sunita Marshall
 Asif Raza Mir
 Mohib Mirza
 Haseena Moin
 Nabeel
 Savera Nadeem
 Ayesha Omer
 Samina Peerzada
 Deepak Perwani
 Quraish Pur
 Faysal Qureshi
 Arjumand Rahim
 Azfar Rehman
 Shehzad Roy
 Behroze Sabzwari
 Humayun Saeed
 Sania Saeed
 Shakeel
 Javed Sheikh
 Najam Sheraz
 Zubaida Tariq
 Maria Wasti
 Nida Yasir

and many more...

Educationist

 Samina Abdullah
 Noman Ahsan
 Aamra Alam
 Shamim Akhter
 Nargis Alvi
 Navera Ansar
 Sadia Aziz
 Zulfiqar Bachani
 Naureen Baig
 Obaidullah Baig
 Asma Bhatti
 Abida Bukhari
 Zubaida Dosell
 Theresa Francis
 Shakira Hameed
 Khalida Iftikhar
 Seema Jalil
 Farah Kamal
 Dr. Khadija
 Dr. Kosar
 Vijay Kumar
 Sheerein Masood
 Yasmin Minhaj
 Shezad Mithani
 Rehana Mughni
 Aneesa Mumtaz
 Danish Naqvi
 Muneeza Naseem
 Raja Rab Nawaz
 Aziz Qabani
 Shamim Rahim
 Rakia Sarwar
 Perveen Shah
 Mohsin Tejani
 Ms. Trisa
 Ali Usmani
 Safi Zakai

References

External links
 
 Official Facebook page
 Director's website

Urdu-language television shows
Television shows set in Karachi
Geo TV original programming
ARY Digital original programming